Maytenus curtisii is a species of plant in the family Celastraceae. It is found in Malaysia and Thailand. It is threatened by habitat loss.

References

curtisii
Flora of Peninsular Malaysia
Flora of Thailand
Vulnerable flora of Asia
Taxonomy articles created by Polbot